The Equestrian competition at the 2010 Summer Youth Olympics in Singapore took place from August 18 to August 24 at the Singapore Turf Riding Club. There were two events, team jumping and individual jumping. The team jumping was between continents.

Competitors

Schedule

Medal summary

Medal table
This table presents only individual results. Mixed team medals are not included.

Events

References 
Equestrian Description at the official site.
Equestrian results at the official site.

 
2010 Summer Youth Olympics events
2010 in equestrian
2010
Equestrian sports competitions in Singapore